Isaza is a surname of Basque origins. Notable people with this surname include:

 Carlos Alberto Restrepo Isaza (born 1961), Colombian-born football coach and current manager 
 Guillermo Cano Isaza (1925–1986), Colombian journalist
 Gustavo Isaza Mejía (died 2007), Colombian physician, surgeon and professor 
 Harold Isaza Gutiérrez (born 1995), Colombian professional footballer 
 Jorge García Isaza (1928–2016), Colombian Roman Catholic bishop
 José Isaza (born 1972), Panamanian swimmer
 Kaleil Isaza Tuzman, American-born entrepreneur associated with digital media
 Ilean Isaza Aizpurúa (1970), Panamanian born Archaeologist and Program Manager

Basque-language surnames